Cynopterus (Latin meaning: ״flying dog״) is a genus of megabats.  The cynopterine section is represented by 11 genera, five of which occur in Malaysia, namely, Chironax, Balionycteris, Penthetor, Dyacopterus, and Cynopterus.  About 30 names for Cynopterus species have been proposed, but only 16 are taxonomically valid forms.

Species within this genus are:

Genus Cynopterus
Lesser short-nosed fruit bat (C. brachyotis)
Horsfield's fruit bat (C.  horsfieldii)
Peters's fruit bat (C. luzoniensis)
Minute fruit bat (C.  minutus)
Nusatenggara short-nosed fruit bat (C. nusatenggara)
Greater short-nosed fruit bat (C.  sphinx)
Indonesian short-nosed fruit bat (C. titthaecheilus)

Betacoronavirus 
During a survey of Cynopterus brachyotis, it was uncovered that a bat coronavirus (Betacoronavirus) is closely related to the bat coronavirus Rousettus bat coronavirus HKU9 species found in Leschenault's rousette which was discovered in the Guangdong and Yunnan provinces.

References

 
Mammals of Southeast Asia
Bats of Malaysia
Bat genera
Taxa named by Frédéric Cuvier

id:Codot